William Turner Logan (June 21, 1874 – September 15, 1941) was a U.S. Representative from South Carolina.

Born in Summerville, South Carolina, Logan attended the public schools, and was graduated from the College of Charleston, South Carolina, in 1895.  He studied law at the University of Virginia in Charlottesville, Virginia.  He was admitted to the bar in 1895 and commenced practice in Charleston, South Carolina.

Political career
He served as member of the State house of representatives 1901-1904.  He was corporation counsel of Charleston 1914-1918.  He served as chairman of the Democratic executive committee of Charleston County 1916-1918.  He served as chairman of the city Democratic executive committee 1918-1922 and reelected in 1922.

Logan was elected as a Democrat to the Sixty-seventh and Sixty-eighth Congresses (March 4, 1921 – March 3, 1925).  He was an unsuccessful candidate for renomination in 1924. He was one of the 62 congressmen, and the only southerner, to vote against the Immigration Act of 1924.

He continued the practice of his profession in Charleston, South Carolina, until his death there on September 15, 1941.  He was interred in Magnolia Cemetery.

References

Sources

Newspapers

Books

External links

Description, Logan Family Papers, 1865-1961 at South Carolina Historical Society
William Turner Logan at The Political Graveyard

1874 births
1941 deaths
People from Summerville, South Carolina
College of Charleston alumni
University of Virginia School of Law alumni
South Carolina lawyers
Democratic Party members of the United States House of Representatives from South Carolina
Burials at Magnolia Cemetery (Charleston, South Carolina)